Josip Marija Carević (born February 16, 1883 in Metković- died 1945 in Veliko Trgovišće) was a bishop of the Diocese of Dubrovnik brutally tortured and massacred by Yugoslav Partisans at the end of World War II.

He was ordained bishop of Dubrovnik on August 4, 1929. During his time as bishop, a large cross was built on the Srđ peak overlooking the city.

He held this post until February 9, 1940. He subsequently retired to the Zagreb region, placing himself at the service of archbishop Alojzije Stepinac. During this time he was named titular bishop of Aristium.

References

1883 births
1945 deaths
People from Metković
Roman Catholic bishops in Yugoslavia
People killed by Yugoslav Partisans